Robert Henry Nelson (1944 – December 15, 2018) was an American economist who was professor of environmental policy in the University of Maryland School of Public Policy and a senior fellow of the Independent Institute. He authored over 100 journal articles and edited book chapters, as well as nine books. Nelson was a nationally recognized authority in areas including the management of public land and zoning in the United States, but is best known for his books about the relationship between economics, environmentalism, and Christianity.

In a review of Economics As Religion: From Samuelson to Chicago and Beyond, economist Robert Tollison wrote that "Nelson's basic thesis is that economics is more like a religion than a science. In fact, he argues that economics in the twentieth century has virtually supplanted organized religion with a creed of material progress." Economist David Colander described Reaching for Heaven on Earth: The Theological Meaning of Economics as arguing that "the economics profession is the priesthood of a powerful secular religion." Nelson's book The New Holy Wars: Economic Religion versus Environmental Religion was silver medal winner in the “Finance, Investment, Economics” category of the 2010 Independent Publisher Book Awards.

Books
 The Use and Management of Federal Coal (PERC, 2017)
 God? Very Probably: Five Rational Ways to Think about the Question of a God (Cascade Books, 2015) 
 The New Holy Wars: Economic Religion versus Environmental Religion in Contemporary America (Penn State University Press, 2010) 
 Private Neighborhoods and the Transformation of Local Government (Urban Institute Press, 2005) 
 Economics as Religion: From Samuelson to Chicago and Beyond (Penn State University Press, 2001) 
 A Burning Issue: A Case for Abolishing the U.S. Forest Service (Rowman & Littlefield, 2000) 
 Public Lands and Private Rights: The Failure of Scientific Management (Rowman & Littlefield, 1995) 
 Reaching for Heaven on Earth: The Theological Meaning of Economics (Rowman & Littlefield, 1991) 
 The Making of Federal Coal Policy (Duke University Press, 1983) 
 Zoning and Property Rights (MIT Press, 1977)

References 

21st-century American economists
1944 births
2018 deaths